Jaime Ruiz can refer to:

 Jaime Ruiz (Mexican footballer) (born 1975), Mexican footballer
 Jaime Ruiz (Peruvian footballer) (born 1935), Peruvian footballer
 Jaime Ruiz (Colombian footballer) (born 1984), Colombian footballer